Paquita la del Barrio (stylized Las verdades bien cantadas, Paquita la del Barrio) is a Mexican drama developed by Sony Pictures Television and Imagen Televisión. It premiered on April 25, 2017 and ended on August 4, 2017. The series tells the story of the life of the singer Paquita la del Barrio during her childhood and adulthood.

Plot 
It tells the story of a woman born in poverty who, with effort and after suffering disappointments and failures, finally achieved musical success and fame to become one of the most known singers in all of Mexico or, as some call her, La Reina del Pueblo (The Queen of the People).

Cast 
 Andrea Ortega-Lee as Paquita la del Barrio
 Erick Chapa as Camilo
 Miguel Ángel Biaggio as Jorge
 Lambda García as Antonio
 Carlos Espejel as Eduardo Toscano
 Sofía Garza as Viola
 Gloria Stalina as Clara
 Marcia Coutiño as Lucía
 Andrés Pardavé as Hernando
 Paloma Woolrich as Engracia
 Milton Cortéz as Gerardo
 Marissa Saavedra as Aurora
 Emilio Guerrero as Padre Fertxu
 Carmen Madrid as Rosa
 Alejandro de Marino as Mario / Marina
 Joaquín Ferreira as Alfonso
 Ariane Pellicer as Griselda
 Fabiana Perzabal as Rafaela
 Mimi Morales as Carmina

Awards and nominations

References

External links 
 

Imagen Televisión telenovelas
Sony Pictures Television telenovelas
Mexican telenovelas
2017 Mexican television series debuts
2017 Mexican television series endings